Joe "Corker" Groves (18 May 1874 – 3 July 1961) was an Australian rules footballer who played for the Essendon Football Club in the Victorian Football League (VFL). A smart winger whose tact overpowered other players, he played in Essendon's first premiership side in 1897. After leaving Essendon in 1900, he had stints with Footscray and North Melbourne in the Victorian Football Association (VFA), and later returned to play one game in the 1908 VFL season.

Sources

 Holmesby, Russell & Main, Jim (2007). The Encyclopedia of AFL Footballers. 7th ed. Melbourne: Bas Publishing.

Essendon Football Club profile

Australian rules footballers from Ballarat
Essendon Football Club players
Essendon Football Club Premiership players
North Melbourne Football Club (VFA) players
Footscray Football Club (VFA) players
1874 births
1961 deaths
One-time VFL/AFL Premiership players